Enkeleitä onko heitä is the fourth solo studio album by a Finnish singer-songwriter Aki Sirkesalo. Released by Sony Music Entertainment in 2001, the album peaked at number five on the Finnish Albums Chart.

Track listing

Chart performance

References

2001 albums
Aki Sirkesalo albums
Sony Music albums